The 2018–19 Dayton Flyers men's basketball team represented the University of Dayton during the 2018–19 NCAA Division I men's basketball season. The Flyers were led by second-year head coach Anthony Grant and played their home games at the University of Dayton Arena as members of the Atlantic 10 Conference. They finished the season 21-12, 13-5 to finish in 3rd place. As the No. 3 seed in the A-10 Tournament, they lost to Saint Louis in the quarterfinals. They received an at-large bid to the NIT where they lost in the first round to Colorado.

Previous season
The Flyers finished the 2017–18 season 14–17, 8–10 in A-10 play to finish in ninth place. They lost in the second round of the A-10 tournament to VCU.

Offseason

Departures

Incoming transfers

Recruiting class of 2018

Honors and awards

Preseason Awards 
Street & Smith's
 All-Conference – Josh Cunningham

Athlon Sports
 All-Atlantic 10 First Team – Josh Cunningham

Lindy's Sports
All-Conference Second Team – Josh Cunningham

Roster

Schedule and results

|-
!colspan=9 style="background:#; color:#;"| Exhibition

|-
!colspan=9 style="background:#; color:#;"| Non-conference regular season

|-
!colspan=9 style="background:#; color:#;"|Atlantic 10 regular season

|-
!colspan=9 style="background:#; color:#;"|Atlantic 10 tournament

|-
!colspan=12 style="background:#; color:#;"|NIT

References

Dayton Flyers Men's
Dayton Flyers men's basketball seasons
Dayton
Dayton
Dayton